Ingram Crockett (February 10, 1856, Henderson, Kentucky - October 5, 1936) was an American poet and journalist.

Crockett was the son of John W. Henderson, a member of the Confederate Congress in Kentucky, and Louisa M. Ingram. Educated at public schools in Henderson, Crockett never went to college. On May 17, 1887 he married Mary Cameron Stites (1864–1955) and continued to play a prominent part in the business and public affairs of Henderson.  With the exception of A brother of Christ, a novel about Kentucky Christadelphians, Crockett's literary output for magazines and in published collections was poetical. "One does not have to travel far in any direction today in order to find many persons declaring that Ingram Crockett is the finest poet living in the state today".

He and his wife were buried in Fernwood Cemetery, Henderson.

Works
(ed. with Charles J, O'Malley), Ye Wassail Bowie, 1888
The port of pleasant dreams, 1892
Rhoda, an Easter Idyll
Beneath Blue Skies and Gray, 1900
A Year Book of Kentucky Woods and Fields, 1901.
A brother of Christ: a tale of western Kentucky, 1905
The Magic of the Woods and other poems, 1908
The greeting and goodbye of the birds, 1912
Betchworth and some other lyrics, 1928

References

External links

1856 births
1936 deaths
People from Henderson, Kentucky
American male poets
Poets from Kentucky
Journalists from Kentucky
19th-century American poets
19th-century American journalists
American male journalists
20th-century American poets
19th-century American male writers
20th-century American male writers
20th-century American non-fiction writers